The Kerrang! Awards 2007 were held in London, England, on 23 August 2007 at The Brewery in Romford and were hosted by Anthrax guitarist Scott Ian.

Kerrang! announced the 2007 nominees on 8 August at the Kerrang! Day of Rock at Virgin Megastores in London. The main categories were dominated by My Chemical Romance and Enter Shikari with four nominations, followed by Fall Out Boy with three. Enter Shikari and Machine Head were the biggest winners of the night, taking home two awards apiece.

Nominations
Winners are in bold text.

Best British Newcomer
Gallows
Kids in Glass Houses
The Ghost of a Thousand
You Me at Six
LostAlone

Best International Newcomer
Thirty Seconds to Mars
Madina Lake
Job for a Cowboy
The Sleeping
Hellogoodbye

Best Live Band
Angels & Airwaves
Muse
Enter Shikari
Aiden
Lostprophets

Best Single
Thirty Seconds to Mars — "The Kill"
My Chemical Romance — "Welcome to the Black Parade"
Funeral for a Friend — "Into Oblivion"
Enter Shikari — "Sorry You're Not a Winner"
AFI — "Miss Murder"

Best Album
My Chemical Romance — The Black Parade
Machine Head — The Blackening
Biffy Clyro — Puzzle
Enter Shikari — Take to the Skies
Fall Out Boy — Infinity on High

Best Video
My Chemical Romance — "Welcome to the Black Parade"
Fall Out Boy — "This Ain't a Scene, It's an Arms Race"
Hellogoodbye — "Here (In Your Arms)"
Linkin Park — "What I've Done"
Paramore — "Misery Business"

Best British Band
Lostprophets
Muse
Enter Shikari
Biffy Clyro
Funeral for a Friend

Best International Band
My Chemical Romance
Machine Head
The Used
Fall Out Boy
Panic! at the Disco

Classic Songwriter
Deftones

Spirit of Independence
Enter Shikari

Hard Rock Hero
Machine Head

Kerrang! Icon
Nine Inch Nails

Hall of Fame
Judas Priest

References

External links
Kerrang! Awards official website

2007
2007 music awards
2007 in London
Culture in London
2007 in British music